Germain Audran (1631–1710) was a French engraver.

Audran, who was born and died at Lyons, was instructed by his uncle Charles in the art of engraving in Paris. His merit was considerable, although very inferior to that of some others of his family. Germain had four sons, Claude III, Benoit I, Jean, and Louis. He engraved several plates, consisting of portraits, and a variety of ornaments, ceilings, and vases, amongst which are the following :

Portraits of Charles Emmanuel II of Savoy, and his wife, in an oval; after F. de la Monce.
Portrait of Cardinal de Richelieu, in an oval.
Portrait of Theophile Reynauld. 1663.
Six sheets of Ceilings; after George Charmeton.
Six ornaments of Vases; after N. Robert.
A book of Friezes; after Raymond Lafage.
A book of views in Italy; after Fancus.
Six Landscapes; after Gaspar Poussin.
Thirty-one designs — Of Fountains, Friezes, &c.; after Le Brun.

His plates are signed with his surname, and with his Christian name, in the following forms: G: Ger: Germ: and in full.

References
 

1631 births
1710 deaths
Engravers from Lyon
17th-century French engravers
18th-century French engravers